is a town located in Fukui Prefecture, Japan. ,  the town had an estimated population of 8,102 and a population density of 63 persons per km2. It is one of the few Hiragana towns in Japan.

Geography
Ōi is located in the far southwestern corner of Fukui Prefecture, bordered by Kyoto Prefecture to the south, Shiga Prefecture to the southeast and the heavily indented ria coast of Wakasa Bay of Sea of Japan to the north. Parts of the town are within the borders of the Wakasa Wan Quasi-National Park.

Neighbouring municipalities 
 Fukui Prefecture
 Obama
 Takahama
 Shiga Prefecture
Takashima
 Kyoto Prefecture
 Ayabe
 Nantan

Climate
Ōi  has a Humid climate (Köppen Cfa) characterized by warm, wet summers and cold winters with heavy snowfall.  The average annual temperature in Ōi  is 14.9 °C. The average annual rainfall is 1949 mm with September as the wettest month. The temperatures are highest on average in August, at around 27.34 °C, and lowest in January, at around 3.9 °C.

Demographics
Per Japanese census data, the population of Ōi has declined over the past 30 years.

History
Ōi is part of ancient Wakasa Province. During the Edo period, the area was part of the holdings of Obama Domain. Following the Meiji restoration, it was organised into part of Ōi District in Fukui Prefecture. With the establishment of the modern municipalities system on April 1, 1889, the villages of Saburi, Ōshima, and Hongō were established. These villages merged to form the town of Ōi on January 15, 1955. On March 3, 2006, the village of Natashō, from Onyū District, was merged into Ōi, which is since written with hiragana instead of kanji. Before the merger the town was written 大飯町.

Economy
The economy of Ōi, previously dependent on commercial fishing, forestry and agriculture is now very heavily dependent on the nuclear power industry. The partial closure of the Ōi Nuclear Power Plant has since the 2011 Fukushima Nuclear Disaster has adversely affected the local economy.

Education
Ōi has four public elementary schools and two public middle schools operated by the town government. The town does not have a high school.

Transportation

Railway
  JR West - Obama Line

Highway
 Maizuru-Wakasa Expressway

Local attractions 
Obama Domain Battery Sites, a National Historic Site

References

External links

 

 
Towns in Fukui Prefecture
Populated coastal places in Japan